Matthias Pechmann is a retired German swimmer who won two medals in the individual medley events at the 1970 European Aquatics Championships. Between 1968 and 1970 he won three national titles in the 400 m medley.

After retirement he worked as a swimming coach at SC DHfK Leipzig, the club he was competing for.

References

Living people
German male swimmers
Male medley swimmers
European Aquatics Championships medalists in swimming
Year of birth missing (living people)